25-C-NBOH (2C-C-NBOH, NBOH-2CC) is a derivative of the phenethylamine derived hallucinogen 2C-C which has been sold as a designer drug. It has similar serotonin receptor affinity to the better-known compound 25C-NBOMe.

Analogues and derivatives

 25C-NBF
 25C-NBMD
 25C-NBOH
 25C-NBOMe (NBOMe-2CC)
 25C-NB3OMe
 25C-NB4OMe
 25I-NBOH
 25B-NBOH
 25E-NBOH
 25H-NBOH

Analytical chemistry
25C-NBOH undergoes degradation under routine Gas Chromatography (GC) conditions, as well as other NBOH's substances, into 2C-C. An alternative method proposed for reliable identification of 25I-NBOH using GC/MS may be used for 25C-NBOH analysis.

Legality

United Kingdom

References 

25-NB (psychedelics)
Chlorobenzenes
Designer drugs
Serotonin receptor agonists